Office Loabi is a Maldivian comedy web series written and directed by Amyna Mohamed. The series follows the life of colleagues, Rafhan Shareef, Ahmed Jillian Rashad, Ruby Fazal, Dheena Ahmed, Mohamed Shivaz, Mohamed Afrah, Aminath Shuha and Mariyam Waheedha. The series was announced in March 2022. The pilot episode of the first season was released on 2 April 2022 and was concluded on 14 June 2022. The series was renewed for a second season.

Cast and characters

Main
 Rafhan Shareef as Rameez 
 Ahmed Jillian Rashad as Jaisham
 Ruby Fazal as Raushan Ismail
 Dheena Ahmed as Muneera
 Mohamed Shivaz as Saeed
 Mohamed Afrah as Mohamed Fikury
 Aminath Shuha as Mauna
 Mariyam Waheedha as Shiflyn
 Ibrahim Salim Ismail as Hamdhaan

Recurring
 Ali Inaz as the cleaning boy

Episodes

Development
Filming for the series was completed in March 2022. It was announced that the film will debut several new faces to the industry from the nationally acclaimed Billiard player, Dheena Ahmed, model Ruby Fazal, dancer Rafhan Shareef and Ibrahim Salim Ismail, gym instructor Jillian Rasheed, along with some fresh actors, Ali Inaz, Aminath Shuha, Mohamed Shivaz, Mohamed Afrah and Mariyam Waheedha. A casting call was made on 11 July 2022 to audition new actors for the second season of the series.

Release and reception
The first episode of the series was released on 2 April 2022 in Baiskoafu, on the occasion of Ramadan 1443. Reviewing the first episode of the series, Ahmed Rasheed from MuniAvas in particular praised the performance of Mariyam Waheedha and Mohamed Afrah while highlighting the "excellent integration of a unique concept to the viewers".

References

Serial drama television series
Maldivian television shows
Maldivian web series